Diffuser may refer to:

Aerodynamics
 Diffuser (automotive), a shaped section of a car's underbody which improves the car's aerodynamic properties
 Part of a jet engine air intake, especially when operated at supersonic speeds
 The channel between the vanes of the stator of a centrifugal compressor

Other uses
 Sound diffuser, a device that scatters reflections of sound across frequencies
 Diffuser (band), a punk rock band from New York, U.S.
 Diffuser (breathing set part), a device fitted over an underwater breathing set's exhaust orifice to break up the gas outflow
 Diffuser (hair), a blowdryer attachment that diffuses heat as it dries the hair 
 Diffuser (heat), a cooking item that is placed above a heating element to separate the cooking utensil from the heat source
 Diffuser (optics), a device that spreads out or scatters light
 Diffuser (sewage), an aerating device for sewage and industrial waste water treatments
 Diffuser (thermodynamics), a device that controls the characteristics of a fluid at the entrance to a thermodynamic open system 
 Aroma lamp (sometimes called an aromatherapy diffuser or reed diffuser), used to disperse essential oils into the surroundings
 Diffuser.fm, website by Townsquare Media

See also
 Diffusion (disambiguation)